Beino - Qboula  is an area in the Akkar district in Lebanon. Beino has a total area of around 20 Square kilometers with a population of 2500.

History
In 1838, Eli Smith noted  the villages as Binu and Kubula,  located west of esh-Sheikh Mohammed. The inhabitants in both villages were Greek Orthodox Christians.

In 2009 there were 2,965 eligible  voters  in Beino, and 384 in Qboula. The population in Qboula were all  Greek Orthodox Christians, while the population of Beino were Greek Orthodox  "and other confessions".

Notable persons 

 Issam Fares

References

Bibliography

External links
Beino - Qboula, Localiban 

Populated places in Akkar District
Eastern Orthodox Christian communities in Lebanon